The University of Health Sciences Antigua (UHSA) is a private, for-profit medical and nursing school located in Dow's Hill near Falmouth, Antigua, in the Caribbean. UHSA confers upon its graduates the Doctor of Medicine (MD) and Bachelor of Science in Nursing degree.

History
UHSA was established in 1982 and began instruction in 1983. Formerly a NASA tracking station, the university is located on a  area within the Historical National Park area of English Harbour.

Doctor of Medicine Curriculum
The Doctor of Medicine program at UHSA is a four-year course of study that consists of two semesters per calendar year. Semesters 1-4 are Basic sciences semesters that are completed at the university's Antigua campus. The remainder of the program consists of Clinical Clerkships at affiliated hospitals in the United States, Canada, Puerto Rico, the United Kingdom, and Pakistan.

Government recognition
UHSA is recognized by the Government of Antigua and Barbuda. Because of this recognition, the university is listed in the FAIMER International Medical Education Directory (IMED).

Licensure restrictions
In the United States, the medical boards of the following states have listed UHSA as an institution whose graduates are ineligible for licensure:
California
Indiana
Kansas
North Dakota

See also 
 International medical graduate
 List of medical schools in the Caribbean
 List of universities in Antigua and Barbuda

References

Medical schools in Antigua and Barbuda
Saint Paul Parish, Antigua and Barbuda
Educational institutions established in 1982
1982 establishments in Antigua and Barbuda